South Shore Vocational Technical High School is a public high school located in Hanover, Massachusetts, United States. The school serves about 600 students in grades 9 to 12. The schools district code is 08730000. The school itself is located near the Hanover/Norwell village of Assinippi, as it educates students from the towns of Hanover, Norwell, Scituate, Hanson, Pembroke, Rockland, Whitman, Abington, and other Plymouth County towns.

References

Educational institutions in the United States with year of establishment missing
Public high schools in Massachusetts
Schools in Plymouth County, Massachusetts